Julien Gibert (born September 8, 1978 in Rillieux-la-Pape, Rhône) is a French professional football player.

He played on the professional level in Ligue 2 for Dijon FCO.

References

1978 births
Living people
People from Rillieux-la-Pape
French footballers
French expatriate footballers
Expatriate footballers in Belgium
Ligue 2 players
Dijon FCO players
FC Martigues players
Pau FC players
SO Romorantin players
Association football defenders
Sportspeople from Lyon Metropolis
Footballers from Auvergne-Rhône-Alpes